Yelam Sambat (Devanagari: येलम संबत् ) is the lunar calendar used by the Kirat community of Nepal. The Yelam Sambat calendar is named after the first Kirat king Yalambar. The Limbus call it Yele Tangbe, the Rais call it Yele Dong, and the Sunuwars call it Yele Thoche.

It is said that this calendar started when the Kirat king Yalambar defeated the Gopal dynasty in the Kathmandu Valley. The Yele Sambat calendar begins on 15 January. This new year day is also celebrated as Maghe Sankranti in Nepal when people eat sweet potato and various kinds of yams and sel roti.

On 15 November 2009, Subash Chandra Nembang, Chairperson of the Constituent Assembly (CA) stressed the need for the Government of Nepal to recognize Kirant Yele Sambat and ensure that it would be included in the constitution as annex. On 15 January 2010, the Government of Nepal stated that it would formally recognise Yele Sambat.

History
According to Gopal Vamsawali, 32 Kirat kings ruled the Kathmandu valley for 1963 years and 8 months. The Kirat rule ended and the Licchavi rule was started by Jaya Varma in Saka Sambat 107. 78 years of time period is added to convert Saka Sambat into AD, i.e., Saka Sambat 107 + 78 years = 185 AD. The Kirat kings ruled for 1963 years and 8 months. Deducting 185 from 1963 years and 8 months = 1779.8 BC, which is the starting ruling year of the first Kirat king Yalambar. In 2018, adding 1779.8 BC and 2017 AD, the Yele Sambat year comes out to be 3797 years and 8 months.

List of Kirat kings
According to Gopal Vamsawali, 32 Kirat kings ruled the Kathmandu valley. The list of these kings along with their period of rule is given below:

1) King Yelam - 90 years
2) King Pelam - 81 years
3) King Melam - 89 years
4) King Changming - 42 years
5) King Dhaskang - 37 years
6) King Walungcha - 31 years 6 months
7) King Hooting - 40 years 8 months
8) King Hurma - 50 years
9) King Tuske - 41 years 8 months
10) King Prasaphung - 38 years 6 months
11) King Pawa - 46 years
12) King Daasti - 40 years
13) King Chamba - 71 years
14) King Kangkang - 54 years
15) King Swananda - 40 years 6 months
16) King Phukong - 58 years
17) King Singhu - 49 years 6 months
18) King Julam - 73 years 3 months
19) King Lukang - 40 years
20) King Thoram - 71 years
21) King Thuko - 83 years
22) King Varmam - 73 years 6 months
23) King Gungjung - 72 years 7 months
24) King Puska - 81
25) King Tyapami - 54 years
26) King Mugmum - 58 years
27) King Shasaru - 63 years
28) King Gunam - 74 years
29) King Khimbu - 76 years
30) King Girijung - 81 years
31) King Khuranja - 78 years
32) King Khigu - 85 years

References

External links
Kiranti New Year

Calendars
Nepali calendar